Tisdale Airport  is located adjacent to Tisdale, Saskatchewan, Canada.

The airport has one paved runway 14/32 with aircraft radio control of aerodrome lighting, two grass runways, 17/35 and 08/26. There are several hangars and a terminal building with washroom, lounge, and telephone.

The Tisdale Aviation Association, Canadian Owners and Pilots Association (COPA) Flight 93, operates from Tisdale Airport.

See also 
 List of airports in Saskatchewan

References 

Registered aerodromes in Saskatchewan